Hajjiabad or Hajiabad may refer to:

Iran

Alborz Province
Hajjiabad, Alborz, a village in Nazarabad County, Alborz Province, Iran

Ardabil Province
Hajjiabad, Ardabil, a village in Khalkhal County

Bushehr Province
Hajjiabad, Dashtestan, a village in Dashtestan County
Hajjiabad, Jam, a village in Jam County
Hajjiabad, Tangestan, a village in Tangestan County

Chaharmahal and Bakhtiari Province
Hajjiabad, Farsan, a village in Farsan County
Hajjiabad, Kiar, a village in Kiar County
Hajjiabad, Kuhrang, a village in Kuhrang County
Hajjiabad, Bazoft, a village in Kuhrang County
Hajjiabad-e Jalil, a village in Kuhrang County
Hajjiabad, Lordegan, a village in Lordegan County

East Azerbaijan Province
Hajjiabad, East Azerbaijan, a village in Charuymaq County

Fars Province
Hajjiabad, Eqlid, a village in Eqlid County
Hajjiabad, Jahrom, a village in Jahrom County
Hajiabad, Jahrom, a village in Jahrom County
Hajjiabad, Kazerun, a village in Kazerun County
Hajjiabad, Chenar Shahijan, a village in Kazerun County
Hajjiabad, Shapur, a village in Kazerun County
Hajjiabad, Kharameh, a village in Kharameh County
Hajjiabad (30°38′ N 53°14′ E), Khorrambid, a village in Khorrambid County
Hajjiabad, Lamerd, a village in Lamerd County
Hajjiabad, Sahray-ye Bagh, a village in Larestan County
Hajjiabad, Marvdasht, a village in Marvdasht County
Hajjiabad, Kamfiruz, a village in Marvdasht County
Hajjiabad, Mohr, a village in Mohr County
Hajjiabad, Galleh Dar, a village in Mohr County
Hajjiabad-e Mallu, a village in Mohr County
Hajjiabad, Neyriz, a village in Neyriz County
Hajjiabad, Qir and Karzin, a village in Qir and Karzin County
Hajjiabad, Sepidan, a village in Sepidan County
Hajjiabad, Hamaijan, a village in Sepidan County
Hajjiabad, Shiraz, a village in Shariz County
Hajjiabad-e Pas Kuhak, a village in Shariz County
Hajjiabad, Fars, a city in Zarrin Dasht County
Hajjiabad, Zirab, a village in Zarrin Dasht County

Gilan Province
Hajjiabad, Amlash, a village in Amlash County
Hajjiabad, Lahijan, a village in Lahijan County
Hajjiabad, Rudsar, a village in Rudsar County

Golestan Province
Hajjiabad, Azadshahr, a village in Azadshahr County
Hajjiabad, Kordkuy, a village in Kordkuy County
Hajjiabad-e Kuh Payeh, a village in Kordkuy County

Hamadan Province
Hajjiabad, Famenin, a village in Famenin County
Hajjiabad, Malayer, a village in Malayer County
Hajjiabad, Nahavand, a village in Nahavand County
Hajjiabad-e Kark, a village in Nahavand County
Hajjiabad-e Milab, a village in Nahavand County
Hajjiabad, Tuyserkan, a village in Tuyserkan County

Hormozgan Province
Hajjiabad, Hormozgan, a city in Hajjiabad County
Hajjiabad County, in Hormozgan Province, Iran
Hajjiabad-e Sarhadi, a village in Bashagard County
Hajjiabad-e Baghat, a village in Hajjiabad County
Hajjiabad, Jask, a village in Jask County
Hajjiabad, Minab, a village in Minab County
Hajjiabad, Parsian, a village in Parsian County
Hajjiabad, Rudan, a village in Rudan County

Isfahan Province
Hajjiabad, Falavarjan, a village in Falavarjan County
Hajjiabad, former name of Harand, Iran, a city in Isfahan County
Hajjiabad, Baraan-e Jonubi, a village in Isfahan County
Hajjiabad, Baraan-e Shomali, a village in Isfahan County
Hajjiabad, Khvansar, a village in Khvansar County
Hajjiabad (32°41′ N 52°51′ E), Nain, a village in Nain County
Hajjiabad (32°42′ N 52°55′ E), Nain, a village in Nain County
Hajjiabad, Najafabad, a village in Najafabad County
Hajjiabad, Semirom, a village in Semirom County
Hajjiabad-e Shureh Chaman, a village in Semirom County

Kerman Province
Hajjiabad, Mardehek, a village in Anbarabad County
Hajjiabad, Nargesan, a village in Anbarabad County
Hajjiabad-e Mir Hoseyni, a village in Anbarabad County
Hajjiabad-e Do, Kerman, a village in Fahraj County
Hajjiabad-e Hajj Ali Mohammad, a village in Fahraj County
Hajjiabad, Maskun, a village in Jiroft County
Hajjiabad-e Nazri, a village in Kerman County
Hajjiabad, Qaleh Ganj, a village in Qaleh Ganj County
Hajjiabad-e Payabi, a village in Qaleh Ganj County
Hajjiabad, Kabutar Khan, a village in Rafsanjan County
Hajjiabad, Khenaman, a village in Rafsanjan County
Hajjiabad, Rigan, a village in Rigan County
Hajjiabad, Rudbar-e Jonubi, a village in Rudbar-e Jonubi County

Kermanshah Province
Hajjiabad-e Do, Kermanshah, a village in Kangavar County
Hajjiabad-e Yek, a village in Kangavar County
Hajjiabad, Kermanshah, a village in Kermanshah County
Hajjiabad, Mahidasht, a village in Kermanshah County
Hajjiabad Base, a village and military installation in Kermanshah County
Hajjiabad, Ravansar, a village in Ravansar County
Hajjiabad-e Shanrash, a village in Ravansar County
Hajjiabad, Sonqor, a village in Sonqor County

Khuzestan Province
Hajjiabad, Andika, a village in Andika County
Hajjiabad (31°46′ N 49°30′ E), Masjed Soleyman, a village in Masjed Soleyman County
Hajjiabad, Ramhormoz, a village in Ramhormoz County

Kurdistan Province
Hajjiabad, Chang Almas, a village in Bijar County
Hajjiabad, Korani, a village in Bijar County
Hajjiabad, Dehgolan, a village in Dehgolan County
Hajjiabad, Bolbanabad, a village in Dehgolan County
Hajjiabad, Qorveh, a village in Qorveh County

Lorestan Province

Aligudarz County
Hajjiabad, Aligudarz, a village in the Central District, Aligudarz County
Hajjiabad Beshaq, a village in the Central District, Aligudarz County
Hajjiabad Darvish, a village in the Central District, Aligudarz County
Hajjiabad-e Olya, Lorestan, a village in the Central District, Aligudarz County

Borujerd County
Hajjiabad, Darreh Seydi, a village in Darreh Seydi Rural District, Central District, Borujerd County
Hajjiabad, Hemmatabad, a village in Hemmatabad Rural District, Central District, Borujerd County

Delfan County
Hajjiabad, Mirbag-e Jonubi, a village in Mirbag-e Jonubi Rural District, Central District, Delfan County
Hajjiabad, Nurabad, a village in Nurabad Rural District, Central District, Delfan County
Hajjiabad, Kakavand, a village in Kakavand District, Delfan County
Hajjiabad-e Jadid, a village in Kakavand District, Delfan County

Dorud County
Hajjiabad-e Yarahmadi, a village in Silakhor District, Dorud County

Khorramabad County
Hajjiabad, Khorramabad, a village in Chaghalvandi District, Khorramabad County

Selseleh County
Hajjiabad, Selseleh, a village in Selseleh County
Hajjiabad, alternate name of Gol Dulatshahi, a village in Selseleh County

Markazi Province
Hajjiabad, Arak, a village in Arak County, Markazi Province, Iran
Hajjiabad, Khomeyn, a village in Khomeyn County, Markazi Province, Iran
Hajjiabad (33°39′ N 50°04′ E), Kamareh, a village in Khomeyn County, Markazi Province, Iran
Hajjiabad (33°40′ N 49°59′ E), Kamareh, a village in Khomeyn County, Markazi Province, Iran
Hajjiabad, Khondab, a village in Khondab County, Markazi Province, Iran
Hajjiabad, Mahallat, a village in Mahallat County, Markazi Province, Iran
Hajjiabad, Shazand, a village in Shazand County, Markazi Province, Iran
Hajjiabad, Zarandieh, a village in Zarandieh County, Markazi Province, Iran

Mazandaran Province
Hajjiabad, Amol, a village in Amol County
Hajjiabad, Nur, a village in Nur County
Hajjiabad, Qaem Shahr, a village in Qaem Shahr County
Hajjiabad, Mazkureh, a village in Sari County
Hajjiabad, Rudpey-ye Jonubi, a village in Sari County
Hajjiabad, Tonekabon, a village in Tonekabon County

Qazvin Province
Hajjiabad, Abyek, a village in Abyek County
Hajjiabad, alternate name of Mehdiabad-e Bozorg, a village in Qazvin County
Hajjiabad, Qazvin, a village in Qazvin County
Hajjiabad, Takestan, a village in Takestan County

Qom Province
Hajjiabad, Qom, a village in Qom Province of Iran
Hajjiabad-e Aqa, a village in Qom Province of Iran
Hajjiabad-e Neyzaz, a village in Qom Province of Iran

Razavi Khorasan Province

Bakharz County
Hajjiabad, Bakharz, a village in Bakharz County

Chenaran County
Hajjiabad, Chenaran, a village in Chenaran County
Hajjiabad, Golbajar, a village in Chenaran County

Fariman County
Hajjiabad, Fariman, a village in Fariman County

Firuzeh County

Gonabad County
Hajjiabad, Gonabad, a village in Gonabad County

Joghatai County
Hajjiabad, Joghatai, a village in Joghatai County

Jowayin County
Hajjiabad-e Bazzazi, a village in Jowayin County
Hajjiabad-e Hajji Safar, a village in Jowayin County

Kalat County
Hajjiabad, Kalat, a village in Kalat County

Kashmar County
Hajjiabad, Kashmar, a village in Kashmar County

Khvaf County
Hajjiabad, Khvaf, a village in Khvaf County

Mahvelat County

Mashhad County
Hajjiabad, Ahmadabad, a village in Mashhad County
Hajjiabad, Mashhad, a village in Mashhad County

Nishapur County
Hajjiabad, Miyan Jolgeh, a village in Nishapur County
Hajjiabad, Sarvelayat, a village in Nishapur County
Hajjiabad, Zeberkhan, a village in Nishapur County

Taybad County
Hajjiabad, Taybad, a village in Taybad County

Torbat-e Jam County
Hajjiabad, Torbat-e Jam, a village in Torbat-e Jam County
Hajjiabad, Salehabad, a village in Torbat-e Jam County
Hajjiabad-e Hajji Ebrahim, a village in Torbat-e Jam County
Hajjiabad Molla Qasem, a village in Torbat-e Jam County
Hajjiabad-e Molla Yaqub, a village in Torbat-e Jam County

Zaveh County
Hajjiabad, Zaveh, a village in Zaveh County

Semnan Province
Hajjiabad-e Bostijian, a village in Damghan County
Hajjiabad-e Razveh, a village in Damghan County
Hajjiabad-e Atashgah, a village in Garmsar County
Hajjiabad-e Khvoriad, a village in Semnan County

Sistan and Baluchestan Province
Hajjiabad, Abreis, a village in Iranshahr County
Hajjiabad, Bazman, a village in Iranshahr County
Hajjiabad, Eskelabad, a village in Khash County
Hajjiabad (28°38′ N 60°24′ E), Gowhar Kuh, a village in Khash County
Hajjiabad (28°40′ N 60°21′ E), Gowhar Kuh, a village in Khash County
Hajjiabad, alternate name of Gazu, a village in Khash County
Hajjiabad, alternate name of Mowtowr-e Khvabiar, a village in Khash County
Hajjiabad, Qasr-e Qand, a village in Qasr-e Qand County

South Khorasan Province
Hajjiabad, Alqurat, a village in Birjand County
Hajjiabad (32°46′ N 59°31′ E), Baqeran, a village in Birjand County
Hajjiabad, Nehbandan, a village in Nehbandan County
Hajjiabad, Shusef, a village in Nehbandan County
Hajiabad, Shusef, a village in Nehbandan County
Hajjiabad-e Nughab, a village in Qaen County
Hajjiabad, Sarbisheh, a village in Sarbisheh County
Hajjiabad, Mud, a village in Sarbisheh County
Hajjiabad (33°17′ N 57°30′ E), Tabas, a village in Tabas County
Hajjiabad, South Khorasan, a city in Zirkuh County
Hajjiabad-e Haqdad, a village in Zirkuh County

Tehran Province
Hajjiabad, Shemiranat, a village in Shemiranat County
Hajjiabad-e Arabha, a village in Varamin County
Hajjiabad-e Amlak, a village in Pakdasht County
Hajjiabad-e Salar, a village in Varamin County
Hajjiabad-e Sofla, a village in Malard County

West Azerbaijan Province
Hajjiabad-e Okhtachi, a village in Bukan County
Hajjiabad, Mahabad, a village in Mahabad County
Hajjiabad, Shahin Dezh, a village in Shahin Dezh County
Hajjiabad, Urmia, a village in Urmia County
Hajjiabad, Sumay-ye Beradust, a village in Urmia County

Yazd Province

Ardakan County
Hajjiabad, Ardakan, a village in Ardakan County

Behabad County
Hajjiabad, Behabad, a village in Behabad County
Hajjiabad, Asfyj, a village in Behabad County

Khatam County
Hajjiabad, Marvast, a village in Khatam County

Saduq County
Hajjiabad, Saduq, a village in Saduq County
Hajjiabad, alternate name of Aliabad, Saduq, a village in Saduq County

Taft County
Hajjiabad, Garizat, a village in Taft County
Hajjiabad, Sakhvid, a village in Taft County
Hajjiabad-e Bala, a village in Taft County

Pakistan
Hajiabad, Pakistan, a town in Kotli District, Azad Kashmir, Pakistan